The Esperia Pony ( or ) is a breed of pony originating in the area of the Aurunci Mountains and Ausoni Mountains near Esperia in the province of Frosinone, in the Lazio region of Italy. It is one of the fifteen indigenous horse "breeds of limited distribution" recognised by the AIA, the Italian breeders' association. It is the only Italian breed to be officially denominated a pony.

References

External links
Esperia Horses - Documentary

Horse breeds
Horse breeds originating in Italy